Roderick Bertrand Blakney (born August 6, 1976) is an American-born naturalized Bulgarian former professional basketball player.

College career
Blakney, a 6 ft 1  in (1.86 m) point guard played college basketball at South Carolina State University, averaging 20.6 points, 5.1 rebounds, and 4.7 assists in his senior year during the 1997–98 season.

Professional career
Since college, Blakney has played for numerous teams, including Greek League clubs such as Iraklis Thessaloniki (2001–02), AEK Athens (2002–03), Maroussi (2003–06), Olympiacos Piraeus (2007–08). He has also played with the Russian Superleague club Dynamo Moscow during the 2006–07 season.

In 2008, he joined the Turkish League team Türk Telekom. In 2009, he moved to Panellinios.

In November 2010 he signed a two-month contract with Unicaja Málaga in Spain, that was later extended until the end of the 2010–11 season.

In October 2011 he signed with Lokomotiv Kuban in Russia. In December 2012, he returned to Spain and signed with Cajasol Sevilla until the end of the season.

National team career
Blakney was also a member of the senior Bulgarian national basketball team.

References

External links
Euroleague.net Profile
Olympiacos.org Profile
FIBA.com Profile
Eurobasket.com Profile
AEK Profile
ACB.COM Profile

1976 births
Living people
People from Hartsville, South Carolina
AEK B.C. players
American expatriate basketball people in Greece
American expatriate basketball people in Russia
American expatriate basketball people in Spain
American expatriate basketball people in the Dominican Republic
American expatriate basketball people in Turkey
American men's basketball players
Basketball players from South Carolina
BC Dynamo Moscow players
Bulgarian men's basketball players
Bulgarian people of American descent
Baloncesto Málaga players
Real Betis Baloncesto players
Cincinnati Stuff players
Dakota Wizards players
Iraklis Thessaloniki B.C. players
Liga ACB players
Maroussi B.C. players
Naturalised citizens of Bulgaria
Olympiacos B.C. players
PBC Lokomotiv-Kuban players
Panellinios B.C. players
Point guards
Sioux Falls Skyforce players
South Carolina State Bulldogs basketball players
Türk Telekom B.K. players